Even So was the seventh studio album by Japanese singer-songwriter Bonnie Pink, released on the Warner Music Japan label on May 12, 2004.

Track listing

Charts

Album

Singles

References

2004 albums
Bonnie Pink albums
Albums produced by Tore Johansson
Warner Music Japan albums